Fancy Crane is a fictional character on the NBC/DirecTV soap opera Passions and is portrayed by actress Emily Harper from the May 13, 2005, episode through the series finale. Following her debut, Fancy quickly becomes one of the soap's lead heroines — Harper appears in 209 out of the 254 episodes that aired in 2006, a feat surpassed only by Lindsay Hartley (Theresa).

Introduced in the May 13, 2005, episode alongside fellow Harmonyite Noah Bennett in Las Vegas, Fancy is quickly characterized as a vain, spoiled celebutante comparable to Paris Hilton and is soon revealed to be one of the frequently mentioned but heretofore unseen daughters of Julian and Ivy Crane; she is also established to be the favorite granddaughter of billionaire villain Alistair Crane and is later revealed to be the sole heiress to his empire.  Fancy's first year of storylines is dominated by her off-and-on relationship with Noah and the conflict that it creates between herself and Alistair.  With the middle-class Noah, Fancy begins her transformation from a spoiled princess into a caring, responsible young woman, but their relationship is eventually torn apart by Noah's lies and Alistair's machinations.

Nursing her heartbreak in Rome, Fancy befriends her aunt's ex-fiancé, Luis Lopez-Fitzgerald, and joins him in his search for his son, and Fancy's cousin, Marty, furthering her process of maturation.  Luis and Fancy eventually fall in love and become one of the program's central couples, bitterly dividing fans of the couple and those who prefer Luis with Sheridan and/or Fancy with Noah. Nonetheless, Fancy's storylines since mid-2006 center on her romance with Luis and subsequent rivalry with her aunt, Sheridan, and her sister, Pretty, for his affection. Despite numerous obstacles, Luis and Fancy are married in the July 23, 2008, episode, and Fancy announces her pregnancy in the series finale.

Character history

Character background

Fancy  was born in 1980 to Julian Linus Crane, an executive at Crane Industries and the eldest son of ruthless multi-billionaire Alistair Ephraim Crane and his first wife, Katherine Barrett, and Ivy Winthrop, a socialite and the daughter of the late former Governor Harrison Winthrop and his wife, the late Helen Revere-Mott-Beaton. Fancy is the scion of numerous wealthy, prominent families that immigrated to North America before the American Revolutionary War - her paternal grandfather is a descendant of William Ephraim Crane, a magistrate who ordered Tabitha Lenox's execution in 1693, sparking Tabitha's vendetta against the Crane family, and her maternal grandmother was a descendant of Paul Revere. Fancy is largely of English descent, with some French ancestry, and was brought up, to some degree, as a Roman Catholic.

Fancy was raised as the second of four children - Ethan Crane (later Winthrop), who was revealed to be her maternal half-brother in 2001, is about five years her senior, while Fox Crane and Pretty Crane are a few years her junior.  While they were raised in the lap of luxury, the Crane siblings, excluding Ethan, had a dysfunctional childhood, with Ivy admitting that her youngest three children had a father who was "either absent or intoxicated" and a mother "who just didn't care".  Ivy favored Ethan over her other children because he was the son of her "true love", Sam Bennett, and not her husband, whom she loathed, and Fancy, as well as her younger siblings, came to resent their mother for this. Though her younger brother Fox is equally angry with Julian, Fancy never expresses the same sort of bitterness against her father, whom she remembers taking her and her best friend Esme Vanderheusen out for ice cream when they were in the third grade.

Despite being virtually ignored by her parents during her formative years, Fancy did fare better than her younger siblings; since her birth, Fancy has been her grandfather Alistair's favorite relative — Alistair believes her to be the only "true Crane" of all of his descendants.  For some twenty-five years, Alistair was consistently the only person upon whom Fancy could depend for love and support, and he, in many ways, was more of a father to her than Julian — when she was seven, it was Alistair, and not Julian and Ivy, whom she begged for the wild, untamed Arabian stallion she wanted so badly.  Alistair was very protective of his firstborn granddaughter — not even Albert II, Prince of Monaco would have made a suitable husband for his little girl — and he shielded her from his malevolent, vindictive side, which the rest of their family knew to be his true nature. Fancy actually unwittingly brought Alistair's wrath down on others several times, including one time as a child when a boy at the playground hurt her feelings; Fancy later cried to her grandfather about the boy's taunts, and Alistair, in turn, saw that the boy's parents lost their jobs, forcing the couple to leave Harmony with their son.

Alistair's doting was never able to fully satiate Fancy's need to feel wanted and loved by her parents, however. When Fancy was about ten, Julian and Ivy forgot to send for their daughter at Christmastime, leaving her all alone at boarding school. Already secure in her status as a Crane, Fancy called a limo to take her to the mansion in Harmony, but was deeply crushed to find that her parents and siblings had left town for the holidays without her. Fancy's eventual savior was this time Ethan, who arrived with a large bag of presents for his younger sister; even as an adult, Fancy remains close to her elder brother.

As a teenager, Fancy was wild and rebellious; her thirteenth birthday party was canceled five minutes before its designated start time after she and her sister stole the caterer's van and drove it halfway to neighboring Castleton. She was also pulled over by future police chief Sam Bennett at least once for driving over the speed limit and without a license after she took her parents' Ferrari for a joyride at age fourteen. The majority of Fancy's most serious infractions occurred while with Esme Vanderheusen, who became her best friend when they met in boarding school. Despite the fact that they were both wild and wealthy, Esme insists that Fancy never engaged in drug use. Partying and rebellion did not fulfill Fancy, however, and she frequently wished for a more "normal" life; Fancy's favorite book as an adolescent was Dreams of a Varsity Cheerleader, and she longed to trade her life at her all-girls boarding school for the heroine's co-ed public high school.

Both Fancy's childhood and teenage years were marked by a sometimes competitive relationship with her younger sister, Pretty. The girls' aunt Sheridan offers an anecdote in January 2007 in which she accuses Fancy of stealing Pretty's date one Labor Day by pretending to sprain her ankle on the family's yacht. According to her account, Fancy, not Pretty, ended up dating the country club boy, then broke up with him after a week once she was satisfied that she had beaten her sister; Fancy, however, vehemently denies that the situation occurred as her aunt outlines. Sometime after this incident, Fancy and Pretty were involved in a physical altercation with one another - Pretty claims that Fancy was jealous of her relationship with a boy named Harrison, while Fancy maintains that Pretty had been choking her - in which Fancy poured cyanuric acid on the right side of her sister's face. Though Fancy claims that she acted in self-defense and was unaware of the bottle's contents, the chemicals nonetheless apparently left the side of Pretty's face heavily scarred, and Pretty has never forgiven her sister, maintaining her belief that Fancy acted to prevent another man from ever preferring Pretty over herself.

Sometime before July 1999, Fancy departed Harmony for a prestigious university, and did not return until June 2005, although according to Ivy, Fancy has yet to complete her degree. It was originally said in 2005 that Fancy later made her way to Italy with her sister sometime in 2004 or 2005, with the two parting ways after Pretty fell in love with an Italian nobleman, although the revelation of Fancy and Pretty's feud in 2007 seems to have created a retcon.

Relationship with Noah

Beginnings in Las Vegas and progression in Harmony, 2005
In May 2005, Fancy is introduced as a spoiled, selfish "princess", similar to Paris Hilton, who owns a small dog and has supposedly dated two of Hilton's ex-boyfriends. She is partying in Las Vegas with her friend Veronica when she sets her sights on Noah Bennett, who is living under the alias of Ned. Noah rejects Fancy's advances, mistaking her for a prostitute, infuriating the heiress. Noah and Fancy meet again that night when she seeks solace from an attempted rapist. The hotel staff discover that Noah has been squatting and attempt to apprehend the pair. The two are spooked when they find a suitcase full of money along with Fancy's attempted rapist. They give the money to two nuns and head home, unaware that they both call Harmony home.

Back in Harmony, Fancy and Noah both learn who the other is, and Fancy complains to Alistair about Noah's treatment of her in Vegas. Alistair declares war on the Bennett family and has Sam Bennett fired from his position as chief of police. Noah is furious with Fancy, but protects her from the Las Vegas mobsters and saves her during the summer 2005 tsunami. Once again thrown together in a fight for survival, Fancy finally admits to herself her true feelings about Noah. However, Fancy is devastated when she finds a letter from Noah's ex-girlfriend in Noah's wallet, reminding Noah that he'd claimed that he'd never love another girl the way he'd loved her. When Noah leaves town to protect his family from his Las Vegas enemies, unaware that Alistair has already taken care of the men, Fancy reluctantly listens to Ivy and chases after him, and the two reconnect. Noah and Fancy are about to consummate their relationship at Sheridan's cottage when Alistair arrives. Unaware that Noah is hiding in the other room, he lectures his granddaughter, warning her to stay away from "commoners" like Noah Bennett. Fancy placates her grandfather, but Noah believes that her hurtful words are true and angrily leaves, breaking up with Fancy later that night. After a date with Edmund Sinclair, one of Noah's friends from grade school and the grandson of one of Alistair's business associates, Noah and Fancy overcome their misunderstandings and have sex on the beach. Unbeknownst to the couple, Alistair is watching them from the bushes; in retaliation, he plants drugs and a gun in Noah's car, resulting in Noah's arrest. Fancy briefly breaks up with Noah, hoping to save him from her grandfather's wrath, but they eventually decide to find strength in their love.

Fancy is devastated when Alistair removes her from his will after he marries Theresa Crane and adopts her son Little Ethan. Although she is sure that a future with Noah is more important than the Crane billions, Fancy has difficulty adjusting to the idea of being "poor" and having to work for a living. Fancy exploits her position as Alistair's favorite to get Noah a position at Crane Industries, but Noah is furious that Fancy would suggest such a thing, and they break up again. Fancy goes to work at Crane Industries as head of the style division, but not even work can distract her from missing Noah. When her best friend, Esme Vanderheusen, visits Harmony and sets her sights on Noah, Fancy becomes so jealous that she tricks Esme into leaving town and reunites with Noah. Still, the couple is unable to find happiness when Fancy begins to suspect Noah of infidelity. In December, Fancy finds Noah and Theresa at one of the Crane cabins with Fancy and Noah's mutual half-brother Ethan, who is to be removed from life support. Furious with Noah for defying Ethan's wishes, Fancy breaks up with him once more, but agrees to wait until after Christmas to call the cops. Unfortunately, the police find Ethan, and arrest Theresa, Noah and Fancy. Alistair bails his wife and granddaughter out of jail, and Fancy, having forgiven Noah, arranges for them to spend Christmas Eve together at the jail.

Disintegration, 2006
Noah is eventually released from jail, but when Noah refuses to come clean about his past with Maya, Fancy breaks up with Noah again. Before Noah can come clean, a car crashes through the diner where Fancy and Noah are eating, causing glass to severely damage the optic nerve and lacerate the cornea of Fancy's right eye. Fancy is terrified, but feels even more strongly that she needs to know about Noah and Maya's past, because the organization threatening Noah and Maya is undoubtedly behind the diner incident. Noah and Fancy's reunion is short-lived when Fancy catches Noah in bed with Maya, and Fancy is heartbroken when Noah declares she was only a conquest to him.

With a clean bill of health in regards to her eye, Fancy leaves Harmony for Rome, a city that she hopes will inspire her to design more clothes. In Rome, Fancy runs into Noah and Maya, who are there to double-cross Lena and her terrorist organization. Noah swears his undying love for Fancy, and they sleep together. Noah eventually tells Fancy he was only pretending to be involved with Maya as part of an FB sting to bring down Lena, but Maya and Lena are both dead and Noah's sister Jessica refuses to corroborate his story. Having been lied to too many times, Fancy refuses to believe her ex, though Noah accuses her of not wanting to reunite because she is falling in love with Luis.

Relationship with Luis

New crush in Rome, 2006
Fancy first meets her aunt's ex-fiancé, Luis Lopez-Fitzgerald, in Rome when she and Noah hear a woman in the catacombs screaming.  Beneath the city, Noah and Fancy find Luis and Chad Harris, who have been buried beneath the rubble of a cave-in.  Luis, mistakenly believing that Fancy is her aunt Sheridan, kisses her, and later carries his almost-niece out of the catacombs after a falling rock strikes her in the head.  It is during this event that Fancy first develops a crush on Luis, though both remain oblivious to her true feelings and become good friends.  As Harper notes, "[Luis] and Fancy are the walking wounded.  They have two totally different stories, but they find common ground and connect".

Luis, fearing that Fancy might be the "[person] from Harmony who will die in Rome", decides to become Fancy's bodyguard, a difficult task.  Fancy unknowingly ends up becoming friends with none other than her deranged half-aunt, Beth Wallace, who erroneously believes that Luis and Fancy are lovers.  Beth tries to kill Fancy both in Roman ruins and in her hotel room by locking Luis in the bathroom and smothering Fancy with a pillow, but ultimately fails at both attempts.  Fancy, fearful that Beth might return, has Luis platonically share her bed for protection; Noah walks in on the two and believes that they have had sex.  Noah tells Fancy that she disgusts him, and Luis comforts Fancy as she cries.  After her attack, Fancy becomes determined to help Luis find his son, Marty, whom Beth has kidnapped.  Fancy uses Beth's determination to commit murder to lure her to an art gallery, but Beth escapes into a cab with Marty.  Luis and Fancy chase the cab via motorcycle, but the cab crashes and bursts into flames, apparently killing Beth and Marty.

When Sheridan calls with the news that Alistair is no longer in a coma and is more than likely in Rome, Luis sets out to murder Alistair, blaming him for Marty's death; Fancy follows.  They, along with Noah and Chad, find Alistair in the basement of a church possessing the omega symbol, where he is attempting to heat the chalice in the fire and thus become omnipotent.  The four stop him, but he triggers a cave-in and escapes.  Luis and Fancy find him in an exact replica of his Harmony study in the catacombs, where he is accompanied by a very-much-alive Beth.  Luis and Fancy attempt to take the two to the police and force them to reveal Marty's whereabouts, but Alistair and Beth again escape, retrieving Marty and fleeing to some Roman ruins.  There, Alistair unleashes lions on the two, forcing Fancy to realize just how evil her grandfather truly is, and when Luis has to stop to save Fancy, the trio escape.  Demented Beth, however, is determined to still be with Luis and calls him, allowing Interpol to track the signal to a train preparing to leave the city.  Luis, Fancy, and Noah take an Interpol helicopter to chase after Marty, but a mysterious drone plane destroys a bridge, causing the train to plummet into a ravine and killing Alistair, Beth, and Marty.  Devastated, Luis, Fancy, and the rest of those involved in the vendetta storyline return to Harmony.

Progression in Harmony, 2006
Upon returning to Harmony, Fancy comes to realize that she has feelings for Luis and, with Sheridan's blessing, begins to actively pursue a relationship with him.  She quits her job at Crane and joins the police cadet training program in order to be close to the object of her desires, but she eventually comes to love police work, as well, and refuses to quit when she discovers that officers and cadets are forbidden from fraternizing.  Instead, she and Luis decide to officially begin dating after she has been graduated from the police academy.

While playing with her young cousin, James, Fancy realizes that the boy saw the man who had murdered one of the Cranes' maids, Phyllis.  Fancy chases after Spike without calling for back-up, and he renders her unconscious in an abandoned mineshaft, blindfolds her, and attempts to rape her.  Chris discovers what Spike is attempting and stops him, but Fancy escapes and flees, eventually falling through some rotten floorboards and landing, unconscious, on a platform many feet down.  Chris and Spike both believe Fancy to be dead and leave her body in the shaft.  Luis, meanwhile, searches frantically for his would-be girlfriend, causing Sheridan to become stricken with jealousy.  She fixes Luis some tea and puts a sleeping pill in it, despite the fact that such an act risks her own niece's life.  However, in their unconscious states, Luis and Fancy's souls are able to connect; when Luis wakes, he finds dirt and blood on his jacket that were not there before he fell asleep.  With the dirt and blood, Luis, Sheridan, and Paloma are able to find the mineshaft.  While attempting to rescue Fancy, she and Luis plummet to the bottom of the mineshaft; as Fancy lies dying, Luis builds a fire and strips in order to keep her warm with his body heat.  Fearful of losing her, Luis admits that he is in love with Fancy for the first time.  Fancy survives, and the two grow closer, though they are still unable to officially become a couple due to the police department's regulations.

Rapes and Luis's incarceration, 2006–07

Back at work, Fancy is determined to prove herself to Luis, her superior; she switches with another officer in order to go undercover and catch a peeping tom.  The sting backfires, however, and by the time Luis arrives, it is too late — the peeping tom has brutally raped Fancy, leaving the young woman emotionally scarred.  At the hospital, she falls into a coma; Luis remains by his love's side, encouraging her to wake up, while a jealous Sheridan tells her comatose niece that she is no good for Luis and will only bring him pain.  Fancy eventually regains consciousness, the Christmas miracle of 2006.  Though emotionally and physically devastated by her rape, Luis swears to stand by her side as she heals.

While Fancy sleeps, trying to recover from her rapes, her rapist begins using a secret passageway leading to her closet to terrorize her while she is alone.  During one attack, Fancy is able to rip a button from her attacker's shirt, but Sheridan finds and hides it, convincing Luis that a combination of trauma and alcohol have caused Fancy to imagine her attacks while also suggesting that Fancy may be purposely fabricating the attacks for attention. Fancy lashes out at her aunt, revealing that she had heard Sheridan's monologue as she lay in a coma, but Luis is unprepared to believe that his ex-flame has changed so drastically.  Luis's disbelief soon leads to tragedy when Fancy's attacker returns one night as she sleeps in her "princess room". The attacker injects Luis with a drug as well as undressing Luis exposing his torso and genital area including pulling out a condom. The drug causes Luis to hallucinate that he is making love to Fancy while the attacker rapes him by manually milking his genitalia and then spermjacks his semen collected into the condom.    After dragging Luis away, the attacker then rapes Fancy for a second time, at which time he inserts Luis's stolen semen into her vagina. When Chad and Whitney hear Fancy screaming they burst into her room, finding her alone but bruised.

The decision to have Fancy raped for a second time stunned and even upset some fans.  Harper admitted that the rape scenes were "definitely, as an actor, one of the most challenging scenes I've ever done.  There was a couple of months where it was numerous times, numerous occasions where Fancy was raped and... we wanted to present it in a realistic fashion and show that emotional aspect of going through something like that.  I think we conveyed that very well."

Everyone searches the mansion for Fancy's attacker, finally finding the masked man unconscious in the pantry.  When his mask is removed, the man is revealed to be none other than Luis.  Fancy is devastated by the turn of events, unsure if she can trust Luis after he promised — and failed — to protect her.  Fancy eventually agrees to undergo a rape kit, and the DNA found inside of her is a perfect match to that of Luis.  As Fancy had earlier admitted that she and Luis have never had sex, Luis is arrested for rape and then later released on bail.  Hoping to prove his innocence, both Luis and Fancy undergo hypnosis; Luis eventually remembers being attacked by the Blackmailer, and both he and Fancy refer to their attacker as being female.  Luis and Fancy hope to be able to finally prove his innocence when Simone's girlfriend, Rae, claims to have information about Fancy's attacker, but the attacker murders Rae and frames Luis; after acid is poured on Fancy's leg while she and Luis are away from Harmony, he is arrested and held in jail.

Fancy is later called to the scene of an arson, where she sees the assumed arsonist inside; when a box of ammunition explodes due to the heat, she believes that she is being shot at and returns fire, striking the arsonist.  She soon discovers that the arsonist is none other than Luis, who had realized that he was about to be framed for another crime and rushed to stop the real criminal, and he is rushed to the hospital, where he survives but is charged with arson and a second murder, that of a bartender at the Blue Note who claimed to have information on the attacker from Rae.  Luis and his brother, Miguel, are both tried at the same time, despite having committed unrelated crimes.  Fancy provides helpful testimony on the witness stand, but a jealous Sheridan takes the stand and destroys her niece's credibility while admitting that she still wants Luis for herself.  Luis is convicted of all five crimes and is furious with Sheridan for her antics.

Luis is sent to prison, but, hoping to spare Fancy the pain of seeing him incarcerated, removes her from the visitors list.  Determined to see Luis, she disguises herself as a prison guard so that she can see and watch over Luis.  Unbeknownst to her, Sheridan has disguised herself as a man and sneaked in as Luis's cellmate; Fancy sees Sheridan kiss Luis and believes that Luis has "turned gay".  After confronting Luis in solitary confinement, she eventually comes to find that this is not the case.  The two are about to have sex in the prison infirmary when Sheridan sees a live feed on Fancy's laptop of the two; she calls the warden, and Fancy is ejected from the prison, leaving her unable to protect Luis from the violent prison guards.  After learning that Judge Reilly has ordered that Luis be executed as soon as possible, Fancy begins frantically searching for a way to clear Luis's name.

By late July, Luis's time has nearly run out; all of his appeals have been denied, and his execution is imminent.  Desperate to savor their remaining time together, Fancy proposes to Luis, and he accepts.  They are set to be married early in August, but Fancy's younger sister, Pretty, returns to Harmony just as Fancy is prepared to walk down the aisle.  Pretty threatens to tell Luis how the sisters had been involved in a fight as teens that had left Pretty permanently scarred, and Fancy, who wants to allow Luis to die with faith in her, cancels the nuptials.  Luis is executed on August 6, much to Fancy's dismay, but Endora Lenox quickly turns back time in the execution chamber so that Eve Russell is able to admit that her long-lost son with Julian (and Fancy's half-brother), Vincent Clarkson, was the mysterious blackmailer who killed Rae Thomas and Dylan Flood, set fire to Dylan's apartment, and twice raped Fancy.  Vincent is arrested, and Luis is freed.

Rivalry with Sheridan and Pretty, 2007–08
Angry that Fancy is so happy, Pretty decides to take her revenge on her sister and tells Luis that Fancy had thrown pool chemicals in her face in a purposeful attempt to scar her.  Luis doesn't believe Pretty until Fancy confirms the story, though she denies that the attack was intentional.  Fancy tries to break up with Luis, afraid that the so-called "Crane curse" will cause her to harm Luis, as it has caused all of her Crane relatives to harm their loved ones, but Luis convinces her to continue their relationship.

Early in September, Alistair, with Pretty's help, drugs Fancy and has a mind-control device implanted into her brain via her nose.  When Alistair tries to issue Fancy a command to slap Luis during foreplay, the device malfunctions, and Fancy is hit with a disabilitating headache.  The headache eventually stops, but Fancy's nose soon begins to bleed heavily; the NBC finale on September 7 has Fancy passed out as a result.  In the DirecTV debut on September 17, Fancy quickly regains consciousness.  However, Alistair finally discovers how to properly work the mind-control device and successfully causes Fancy to lash out at Luis and slap him across the face.  Fancy's random and violent outbursts, coupled with Luis's secretive quest to find Marty and magically influenced trysts, both with Sheridan, strain the couple's relationship and eventually lead Fancy to call quits.

After breaking up with Luis, Fancy goes to the wharf to clear her head; there, she comes across her ex-boyfriend, Noah Bennett.  Due to Tabitha's spell, the two wind up kissing.  Later, on Thanksgiving, another of Tabitha's spells transports Fancy to the Lenox living room and causes her to make out with Noah; Noah's girlfriend, Paloma, catches them, but his sister Kay zaps Fancy away and makes all three forget what has happened.  Tabitha is persistent, however, and, while Kay is out, she uses her powers to transport Fancy to Noah's bedroom and cause the two to have sex; when Paloma and Sheridan walk in on them, the two have no idea how they'd wound up together, or why they are in bed together.  Paloma is furious and devastated and breaks up with Noah, while Sheridan gloats to her niece, calling her a slut and accusing her of never truly loving Luis.

When Fancy learns that Luis is missing, she becomes panicked and realizes that she still loves Luis, despite his infidelity with her aunt.  Fancy and Sheridan team up to find Luis, but instead discover him beneath the Crane mansion in an embrace with Pretty.  Fancy is furious, especially since she'd seen feed of them on her PDA having sex.  Luis tries to explain that Alistair would only let them free if he impregnated Pretty, but Fancy refuses to hear his excuses.  However, on Christmas Eve, in a last-ditch attempt to recover her daughter, Tabitha Lenox performs good magic on Luis and Fancy, on whom she previously cast spells to make them have sex with Sheridan and Noah, respectively, and causes Fancy to overcome her reservations about Luis and reunite with him.  Though gloriously happy to be back with Luis, she becomes upset when she learns that Luis failed to inform her that his son, Marty, did not die in Rome, though she is thrilled that he is alive.  Watching Luis with Sheridan and Marty on Christmas Day (actually aired on December 26), Fancy begins to realize that Sheridan will be able to use Marty to bind Luis to her.

Fancy determines to keep Luis, however, and buys an extra ticket for Marty to the Boston Bruins game so that the boy can accompany them on a date.  Marty instantly bonds with Fancy, and both Luis and Fancy are thrilled at how natural the three are together.  However, Pretty, in her quest to win Luis for herself, decides to use Alistair's mind-control device to make Fancy act out.  Under Pretty's control, Fancy lashes out at Luis and Sheridan in front of Marty, even taunting the child, telling him that Alistair is hiding under his bed, waiting to kidnap him again.  After further episodes, Pretty tries to convince Luis that Fancy has reverted to her partying ways while Sheridan insists that Fancy has reunited with Noah, and Luis, though still deeply in love with Fancy, begins to doubt her love for him.  Luis is still trying to sort through his feelings when he and Paloma come across Noah and Fancy, who have been trying to figure out what has been going on between them, on the wharf.  At first convinced that Fancy is cheating on him, Luis quickly becomes concerned when Sheridan and Pretty's battle for control of the remote causes Fancy to run into walls, bark like a dog, and, eventually, collapse and stop breathing.  Once Fancy regains consciousness, the four quickly realize that there is, indeed, something physically wrong with Fancy and fear a brain tumor.  Still, Fancy's near-death experience draws her and Luis closer together than ever before, much to Sheridan and Pretty's chagrin.  Pretty tries to use Luis and Fancy's closeness to convince Sheridan to team up with her, but Sheridan cannot abide by having such power over her niece and throws the remote control into the ocean; the water causes the device to short-circuit, and the chip dislodges itself from Fancy's nose.  When Noah finds the device, he throws it, too, into the ocean, to Pretty's dismay.

After reuniting, Fancy begins thinking about having a baby with Luis.  Though she is eager to become pregnant immediately, Luis is hesitant, preferring to fully recover from the past few months' drama before fathering a second child; Fancy understands but privately fears that Luis believes that her violent mood swings will return.  When Pretty overhears Luis and Fancy's conversation, the younger Crane decides to fake a pregnancy to rip her sister's relationship apart.  Fancy is devastated by the news, fearing that her relationship will be torn apart by Luis's families with her sister and aunt, but Luis vows that Fancy is the only one for him, proposing to her on April 30.  Fancy and Luis eventually discover Pretty's treachery, and after Pretty tries to scar Fancy's face with acid, Sheridan reveals that Pretty's scar has been fake all along.  Luis and Fancy quickly realize that the youngest Crane child is mentally unwell, and Pretty is sent to a mental institution.  The couple are deeply upset by Pretty's plight, but are also happy to be free of her machinations, and begin planning for their imminent wedding.  Fancy and Luis are married on July 23, and Fancy tells Luis that they are expecting a baby in the series finale. It is assumed that Julian becomes head of the Crane Empire with Fancy and her unborn child as heirs presumptive based on Julian's statements in the series finale.

Personality

When first introduced in May 2005, Fancy is portrayed as a vain, spoiled, stubborn, self-centered party girl who, as an heiress to a multibillion-dollar empire, is accustomed to getting everything her way; her grandfather tells her that she was born to "enjoy (herself) and have fun". Overall, Fancy lacks seriousness, wearing frivolous, impractical, attention-grabbing (though not overly revealing) clothing and displaying a fun-seeking attitude. Early on, Fancy is often compared to Alistair in that she will do anything to get what she wanted, though, when she hurts others, it is due to a self-centered inability to see the effects that her actions will have on others and not a malicious desire to cause others pain.

Fancy, despite having traveled around the world, is also extremely naïve; after pawning her watch for an undisclosed sum of money, she uses her profits to purchase lottery tickets, not realizing that her chances of winning are so slim. Fancy also has a deep fear of poverty, or, at least, what she considers to be poverty after having lived her entire life as one of the super-rich. Fancy's personality traits are not all negative, however; Fancy is also a bit of a free spirit and is fiercely protective of her loved ones - she is willing to give up Noah in order to protect him from Alistair.

Fancy's process of maturation essentially begins when she meets Noah, but she does not really become noticeably more mature and adult until 2006. In February that year, Fancy is involved in an accident in which she nearly loses her right eye. The trauma of that event, coupled with the crippling emotional pain she feels when she is led to believe that Noah, the first man with whom she has been in a serious, mature relationship, has cheated on her with his ex-girlfriend and was only with her because of her fame, forces the formerly self-centered heiress to do a great deal of growing up. A key event in Fancy's process of maturation, however, is when she discovers Alistair's true, villainous nature in Rome in July 2006. Up until that point, Alistair has played a huge role in Fancy's life as a sort of indulgent father figure who encourages her partying and shelters her from any real pain. When he sets lions after her and Luis, the façade of the man that she has known is destroyed, and she finally sees the evil person that the rest of Harmony's citizens have tried to show her. With her "father figure" dead, both physically and metaphorically, Fancy is left with no one to shield her from the real world and is forced to finally enter adulthood at either twenty-five or twenty-six years of age. Shortly thereafter, in August 2006, Fancy joins the Harmony Police Department primarily as a way to be close to her crush, Luis Lopez-Fitzgerald. The cadet training program is rigorous and physically taxing, however, and, despite the pain, Fancy discovers a new sense of self-worth; instead of living for and thinking of only herself, she is helping others, something that she finds deeply rewarding after years of being a celebutante.

Another key event occurs in December 2006, when Fancy disobeys Luis's orders and takes part in a sting operation and is brutally attacked and raped. The attack emotionally fractures Fancy, and, for two or three months, she is a shadow of herself, constantly self-conscious and afraid that her attacker will come back and rape her again, which he eventually does a month later. Both the rapes and Luis's subsequent arrest and near-execution for her attacks and the murder of two other people are highly traumatizing events for Fancy, and she loses some of the free-spiritedness that she once possessed as a result.

In later episodes, Fancy has largely shed her vanity and selfishness, though she is still extremely stubborn, and still possesses a bit of the free-spiritedness and love of fun that she did when she was younger; overall, though, Fancy is ashamed or embarrassed by her behavior in her youth. Fancy is deeply compassionate and loving, willing to do anything for her loved ones, and, when not being forced to act against her will, behaves somewhat maternally towards Luis's son, Marty. Though lacking the naïveté she possessed in 2005, Fancy is still very trusting and is eager to believe the best in the people she loves - she refuses to entertain the notion that Esme murdered Fox and quickly and ecstatically forgives Pretty when her sister claims that she wants to be close again; in the latter situation, her trusting nature allows Alistair and Pretty to drug Fancy and implant a mind-control device in her brain.

Mind-control device
When Alistair or Pretty activate the mind-control device, Fancy's true personality disappears and is replaced by an extremely out-of-character demeanor that matches no version of Fancy previously seen. At these times, Fancy is entirely at the will of her grandfather or sister and is forced to act as they want her to act; Alistair generally forces Fancy to become belligerent and abusive, whereas Pretty tends to force Fancy to act cruelly, obnoxiously, and somewhat promiscuously.

Reception
Following the inception of Fancy's relationship with Luis, fan response to the character became more noticeably divided.  While many fans were supportive of Luis and Fancy, or "Lancy", many others remained fans of Luis and Sheridan ("Shuis") and/or Fancy and Noah ("Foah").  According to Emily Harper, "I hear mixed opinions from the fans.  Some of them like Lancy and a lot of them like Shuis."  During the week of March 30, 2008, NBC's official Passions website hosted a poll entitled "Which Crane should Luis be with?"; of those who responded, approximately 60% answered in favor of Fancy, while about 38% supported Sheridan and 2% preferred Pretty.

Fancy was also the center of some controversy when the soap's writers had the character repeatedly sexually assaulted, and twice raped, over a two-month period in 2006–07.  Harper said in one interview that "I didn't think it was very smart for Fancy to be left alone in her bedroom where she kept getting raped over and over... prey to be preyed upon.  That was a little crazy, in my opinion.  One rape was enough... A lot of people wrote in and said that it was getting to be a little too much, too out of control."

Cultural impact
In April 2006, NBC announced that it was launching a clothing line, Crane Couture, in conjunction with a storyline that featured Fancy as the head of the fashion department at Crane Industries.  Crane Couture, a collaboration between Delivery Agent, Inc. and Passions, debuted online on April 6, 2006, and was the first clothing line featured on a soap opera that was also available for sale to the public.  The collection consisted of women's clothing, which NBC Daytime Vice President Annamarie Kostura said would "give Passions fans a taste of Fancy's life, while adding their own unique style to the look."

Crane Couture was featured prominently on Passions; characters often referenced the line, and Fancy wore several of the line's outfits on-air through July while notices on the bottom of the television screen alerted viewers to the Crane Couture website.  The Crane Couture advertisements ended when Fancy began pursuing a career in law enforcement, however, and the collection's website is no longer updated.

See also
Noah Bennett
Celebutante
Crane family
Luis Lopez-Fitzgerald
Esme Vanderheusen

References and footnotes

External links

soapcentral.com|PS Online
Fancy at Soap Central
Passions on NBC

Passions characters
Fictional American police officers
Fictional fashion designers
Fictional socialites
Female characters in television
Television characters introduced in 2005